Superman/Shazam!: The Return of Black Adam is a 2010 short animated superhero film, directed by Joaquim Dos Santos and written by Michael Jelenic, featuring George Newbern and Jerry O'Connell reprising their roles from Justice League Unlimited as Superman and Captain Marvel who cooperate to battle the powerful Black Adam. This was James Garner's last performance before his death.

Plot
The film opens with Black Adam returning to Earth, seen as a meteor crashing into a hillside at night.

The film then cuts to young Billy Batson living alone in a rundown slum in Fawcett City. It is later revealed that Billy is an orphan whose foster parents threw him out.  He goes to a diner to meet with Clark Kent who is writing an article about Billy's situation. Black Adam arrives and attacks Billy, stating his intent to kill the boy before the Wizard can get to him. Clark distracts Adam, allowing Billy to escape while he changes into Superman. Black Adam chases Billy through the streets but Superman intervenes and battles him. At first the two seem evenly matched, but Superman's vulnerability to magic gives Adam the upper hand.

Billy manages to run into the subway where he escapes with the help of a homeless man he had unsuccessfully tried to save from a mugging. Black Adam corners Billy on the tracks, but Billy is apparently run over by a train. He awakens to find he is on an empty subway car which takes him to a gigantic cave. There Billy meets the Wizard Shazam who tells him that he is the next Chosen One. The Wizard explains that Black Adam had been his champion 5000 years ago, but Adam had used his power for personal gain and corrupted the gift. He was then banished across the universe but has now returned seeking vengeance against the Wizard and his new champion. The Wizard bestows his power to Billy and causes a cave in, wishing to atone for the mistake of creating Black Adam. He tells Billy to say his name if he needs help. Billy escapes the collapsing cave and arrives outside.

Billy confronts Adam and, saying "SHAZAM!," finds himself instantly transformed by a bolt of lightning into a powerful adult version of himself with superhuman strength, speed, durability, and flight. The transformation is reversed in the same manner. Billy and Superman join forces to battle Black Adam in the skies. Realizing that he can't defeat both of them, Black Adam destroys a dam which threatens to flood the city. While Superman diverts the flood, Adam takes a motorist as hostage and tells Billy to surrender himself in his mortal form to secure her release.  Billy complies, but Adam throws the hostage into the sky and silences Billy before he can attempt to rescue her.  The woman is rescued by Superman who attacks Adam and frees Billy.  This allows Billy to transform back into Shazam and quickly defeat Black Adam. Shazam is about to kill him, but Superman convinces him to be better than a murderer.  Adam declares that only death will stop him.  The homeless man reappears and reveals himself to be the boy's guardian angel Tawky Tawny. Tawky reverts to his true form as a tiger and threatens to get the Wizard to banish Adam even further across the universe. Unwilling to be banished again, Adam shouts "SHAZAM" reverting to the mortal Teth-Adam. Having been Black Adam for millennia, his mortal body cannot withstand the ravages of time and he turns to dust. It was an apparent bluff, as Tawny confirms the Wizard is indeed dead before leaving.

Days later, Billy is reading Clark's article when he encounters some bullies. They try to intimidate him, but he simply smiles and a bolt of lightning strikes the city.

Cast
 George Newbern as Kal-El / Clark Kent / Superman
 Jerry O'Connell as Billy Batson / Captain Marvel
 Arnold Vosloo as Teth-Adam / Black Adam
 Zach Callison as Billy Batson
 James Garner as Shazam
 Josh Keaton as Punk, Sally's Boyfriend (uncredited)
 Danica McKellar as Sally
 Kevin Michael Richardson as Mister Tawky Tawny

Music
A soundtrack album by Benjamin Wynn and Jeremy Zuckerman was released by Lalaland Records on April 12, 2011.  This release was a limited edition of 1000 units and additionally collected music from the Green Arrow, Jonah Hex, and the Spectre animated shorts of the DC Showcase.

References

External links

 

2010s English-language films
DC Showcase
Animated Superman films
Captain Marvel (DC Comics) in other media
2010 animated films
2010 direct-to-video films
2010 short films
Superman animated shorts
2010s American animated films
2010s direct-to-video animated superhero films
Animated superhero films
Warner Bros. Animation animated short films
2010s Warner Bros. animated short films
Films about rapid human age change
Films directed by Joaquim Dos Santos
Black Adam